Katie Poluta (born 29 May 1997) is a South African tennis player.

Poluta has represented South Africa in Fed Cup, where she has a win-loss record of 2–1.

External links
 
 
 
 Katie Poluta at University of Texas at Austin

1997 births
Living people
South African female tennis players
Sportspeople from Cape Town
Texas Longhorns women's tennis players
White South African people